Stanton P. Sender was born November 11, 1932, in Seattle, Washington. He was an honor graduate of Harvard College and received a J.D. from Harvard Law School in 1956. He then returned to Washington State, where he served as Assistant Attorney General from 1956 to 1961.

In 1961 he served as a trial attorney for the United States Interstate Commerce Commission (ICC) in Washington, D.C. The position at the ICC introduced him to the issue that would dominate his life: transportation. The United States methods of transporting goods and materials was evolving, from domination by railroads to a diversified system incorporating air transport and trucking. Sender became a convert to the idea of deregulation of transportation and worked to forward that goal. From 1963 to 1969, Sender served as transportation counsel for the United States Senate Commerce Committee. He left government service in 1969 to join Sears, Roebuck and Company as Assistant General Counsel for Transportation and Telecommunications. This position was created by Sears to work with Congress, lobbying on behalf of the company on transportation issues. Sender was an integral part of the Sears management team, and would often steer the company around troublesome transportation issues that were subject to ongoing legislation. He was with Sears for 20 years, during which time much important transportation legislation and legal precedents emerged. Upon leaving Sears in 1989, Sender joined the Washington, D.C. law firm of Morgan, Lewis and Bockius, where he continued to specialize in transportation law and lobbying. He was treasurer of the National Industrial Transportation League and belonged to many transportation-related organizations. He was chosen Man of the Year by Chilton's Distribution in 1986. Stanton P. Sender died November 7, 1995, several days after suffering a massive heart attack. He was survived by his wife, Michelle Sender, and two sons, Jason and Todd.

References

Harvard Law School alumni
1995 deaths
Lawyers from Seattle
Harvard College alumni